Altamonte Springs station is a train station in Altamonte Springs, Florida, serving SunRail, the commuter rail service of Central Florida. The station opened May 1, 2014, and marks the return of passenger rail service in Altamonte Springs since the days of the Atlantic Coast Line Railroad. It is the southernmost SunRail station in Seminole County, Florida.

Altamonte Springs is typical of most SunRail stations featuring canopies consisting of white aluminum poles supporting sloped green roofs and includes ticket vending machines, ticket validators, emergency call boxes, drinking fountains, and separate platforms designed for passengers in wheelchairs. The station is located along the former CSX A-Line (originally constructed by the South Florida Railroad) on the northeast corner of County Road 427 and State Road 436. The east side of the station is flanked by a local road named "Station Street", evidently named for the former ACL station, and the parking lot contains entrances both at CR 427 and at Leonard Street.  A transit-oriented development called City Park at Merritt Street, which will feature a three-story, 102-unit affordable housing community consisting of townhomes atop flats, is currently planned to be constructed adjacent to the station.

References

External links

Railway stations in the United States opened in 2014
SunRail stations
Transportation buildings and structures in Seminole County, Florida
2014 establishments in Florida